Mária Mezei (16 October 1909 – 20 April 1983) was a Hungarian film actress. She appeared in more than 30 films between 1936 and 1970.

Selected filmography
 Tales of Budapest (1937)
 One Night in Transylvania (1941)
 Janika (1949)
 The State Department Store (1953)
 Two Confessions (1957)
 Édes Anna (1958)
 Forbidden Ground (1968)

References

External links

1909 births
1983 deaths
People from Kecskemét
Hungarian film actresses
20th-century Hungarian actresses